Biff Mitchell (born 1947) is a novelist, satirist, and humorist.

Born in Toronto, Ontario, Mitchell graduated from the University of New Brunswick with an honors degree in English literature in 1974. After college, he returned to his hometown and worked at the University of Toronto bookstores on the Erindale Campus. He returned to New Brunswick in 1975 and worked at a variety of jobs. The character studies he made during these years formed most of the characters in his first novel, Heavy Load (2000). Mitchell has described the book as the world's first "laundromance", "stories a laundromat would tell if it could talk."

In 1993, he started work at a computer-based training company, FirstClass Systems, which later became LearnStream. His experience with these two companies inspired his second novel, Team Player (2001). He left LearnStream in 2001 to work for another eLearning company, Engage Interactive. While he was at Engage, he finished his third novel, The War Bug (2005).

In 2005, Mitchell served as International Spokesperson for Read an eBook Week, during which time, he worked with Michael S. Hart, founder of Project Gutenberg, on a "Brief History of Project Gutenberg".

Mitchell was a featured writer/instructor at the 2006 Maritime Writers' Workshop & Literary Festival in Fredericton, New Brunswick.

Mitchell lives in Atlantic Canada.

Bibliography
Heavy Load. Australia: Jacobyte Books. 2000
Team Player. Australia: Jacobyte Books. 2001
Smoke Break. Echelon Press. 2001. 
The Baton. Echelon Press. 2002. 
The War Bug. Double Dragon Publishing. 2005. 
eMarketing Tools for Writers, 2nd Edition. Fictionwise. 2005. 
Surfing in Catal Hyuk. 2005.
Twisted Tails: An Anthology to Surprise and Delight. Double Dragon Publishing. 2006. 
Twisted Tails Two: Time On Our Hands. Double Dragon Publishing. 2007.

References

External links
"Brief History of Project Gutenberg"
 Interview and review of Smoke Break by Imprint in Imprint Online (October 31, 2003)
Review of The War Bug by Charlene Austen in Writer’s and Reader’s Network (October, 2005)
Review of The War Bug by Lesley Rice in Tregolwyn Reviews (November 2004)
Review of Team Player by Timothy Mark in Tregolwyn Reviews (November, 2002)

1947 births
Living people
Canadian male novelists
University of New Brunswick alumni
Writers from Toronto